Sean Deason is an American techno producer from Detroit. His aliases include Project X, Sounds Intangible Nature, Freq, and X-313.

Deason got his start doing graphic design for Detroit techno artists while studying at the Center for Creative Studies; among those whose sleeves he designed were Juan Atkins, Derrick May, Kenny Larkin, and A Guy Called Gerald. He first produced for Acacia Records, owned by K Hand, and did work at Richie Hawtin's studio before founding his own label, Matrix Records. His first full-length, Razorback, was issued on Studio !K7 in 1996.

Discography
As Sean Deason
Pump (Matrix Records Detroit, 1994) single
Within (Matrix Records Detroit, 1996) single
Visionary EP (Matrix Records Detroit, 1996) single
Razorback (Studio !K7), 1996) album
Jupiter Sunrise (Studio !K7, 1997) single
Zig (Intuit-Solar, 2000) single
Allegory and Metaphor (Intuit-Solar, 2000) album
Love Alarm (Matrix Records, 2002) single
Elements Vol. 1 (Matrix Records Detroit, 2009) single
Elements Vol. 2 (Matrix Records Detroit, 2009) single
Dot & Etta's Shrimp Hut (Matrix Records, 2009) album
Rebound EP (with Rob Belleville) (aDepth audio, 2012) single
Detroit City EP (Modelhart, 2013) single

As Freq
Plastique (Generator Records, 1994) single
Green EP (Matrix Records Detroit, 1994) single
Red EP (Matrix Records Detroit, 1994) single
Innerspace (Matrix Records Detroit, 1994) single
With A Vengeance (Matrix Records Detroit, 1997) single
Heaven (Distance Records, 1997) single

References

American techno musicians
Musicians from Detroit
Living people
Year of birth missing (living people)
Place of birth missing (living people)